Headwater of Bisotun is a historical Headwater which located in the Ancient site of Bisotun city in Kermanshah Province of Iran. this Headwater listed in Iranian national heritages list on March 16, 2002. it also listed as Iranian national natural heritages on July 25, 2009. Headwater of Bisotun also irrigates nearby farms.

References 

National works of Iran
Tourist attractions in Kermanshah Province
Natural heritage sites in Iran